The following songs were produced by Harmony Samuels.

2005

Nate James – Universal 
"Universal" H-Money Remix (Extended Version)

2007

Jamelia – Walk With Me
"Something About You (H-Money Refix)"

Pyrelli – Vitamin A: A Twist of Fate
"Cant Be Asked" ft. Harmony "H-Money" Samuels

2009

Chipmunk – I Am Chipmunk
"Look For Me"

2010

Chipmunk – Transition
"Flying High"
"Champion" (featuring Chris Brown)
"In the Air" (featuring Keri Hilson)
"Take Off" (featuring Trey Songz)
"Follow My Lead" (featuring Eric Bellinger)
"White Lies" (featuring Kalenna of Diddy-Dirty Money)
"Armageddon" (featuring Wretch 32)
"Picture Me" (featuring Ace Young)
 "Pray For Me"

Maroon 5 – Hands All Over
"No Curtain Call"

Tiwa Savage – Once Upon a Time
"Kele Kele Love"
"Love Me 3x"

Janelle Monáe – For Colored Girls
"Without A Fight"

Jawan Harris
 "Nobody" (Single)

For Colored Girls (Soundtrack)
Janelle Monae – "Without a Fight"

2011

Chris Brown – F.A.M.E.
"Say It With Me"
"Oh My Love"

Chipmunk
"In the Air" ft. Keri Hilson, Take Off ft. Trey Songz

Jacob Latimore - Nothing On Me (Single)
"Nothing On Me"

Mary J. Blige – My Life II... The Journey Continues (Act 1)
"Irreversible"

Thelma Houston - TBD
"Gliding On Love"

JLS – Jukebox
"So Many Girls"

From Above – Breaking From Above
"Not the Same Girl"
"Funny"
"Gotta Play It Fair"

2012

Brandy – Two Eleven
"Without You"

Jennifer Hudson – Think Like a Man OST
"Think Like a Man" (featuring Ne-Yo & Rick Ross)

Chris Brown – Fortune
"Mirage" (featuring Nas)
"Wait For You"

Keke Palmer - Keke Palmer
"You Got Me" (featuring Kevin McCall)
"Dance Alone"

Keyshia Cole - Woman to Woman
"Enough of No Love" (featuring Lil Wayne)

Ne-Yo - R.E.D.
"Don't Make Em Like You" (featuring Wiz Khalifa)

Chip – London Boy
02. "Slick Rick"
05. "Beautiful" 
07. "It's Alright" (featuring Sevyn)

Sevyn Streeter – I Like It (Single)
"I Like It"

B. Smyth – Leggo (Single)
"Leggo" (featuring 2 Chainz)

JLS – Evolution
"Talk It Out"

Guy Sebastian – Armageddon
 "Gold"

2013

Marcus Canty – This...Is Marcus Canty
"In & Out" (featuring ft. Wale)
"Three Words"

Fantasia – Side Effects of You
"Supernatural Love" (featuring Big K.R.I.T.)
"Ain't All Bad"
"If I Was A Bird"
"Girl Talk (Interlude)" (featuring Amber Riley, Yalonda Johnson, & Jennifer Jordan)
"Without Me" (featuring Kelly Rowland & Missy Elliott)
"Get It Right"
"So Much to Prove"
"Change Your Mind"
"Lighthouse"
"Lose to Win"
"End of Me"
"In Deep"
"Haunted" (Bonus Track) (featuring Tank, King Los, Al Sherrod Lambert, & Jamia)
"To The Heaven" (Bonus Track)
"Kiss Bang Boom" (Bonus Track)

Ariana Grande – Yours Truly
"Right There" (featuring Big Sean)
"Piano"
"The Way" (featuring Mac Miller)
"Almost Is Never Enough" (featuring Nathan Sykes)
"Better Left Unsaid"
"The Way (Spanglish Version)" (featuring J Balvin)

Zendaya – Zendaya
"Fireflies"

B5 – Say Yes (Single)
"Say Yes"

Kelly Rowland – Talk a Good Game
"Gone" (featuring Wiz Khalifa)
"You Changed" (featuring Beyoncé and Michelle Williams)
"Put Your Name on It"

Fifth Harmony – Better Together (EP)
"Better Together"

Various Artists – The Best Man Holiday
 Fantasia – "What Christmas Means to Me"
 Marsha Ambrosius & Anthony Hamilton – "As"
 Jayda Brown & Jasmine Watkins, Monica Calhoun – "O Holy Night"

2014

Michelle Williams – Journey to Freedom
"Need Your Help" (featuring Eric Dawkins)
"Yes"
"Everything"
"Fall" (featuring Lecrae & Tye Tribbett)
"Fire"
"Free"
"Just Like You" (featuring Chief Wakil)
"Beautiful"
"Believe In Me
"In The Morning"
"If We Had Your Eyes" (featuring Fantasia)
"Say Yes" (featuring Beyoncé & Kelly Rowland)

Ariana Grande – My Everything
"You Don't Know Me"
"Too Close"

Jasmine V – That's Me Right There
"That's Me Right There" (featuring Kendrick Lamar)
"Me Without You"
"Walk Away"
"I Love Your Crazy"
"Who That"

Teyana Taylor – VII
"It Could Just Be Love (Interlude)"
"Put Your Love On"
"It Could Just Be Love"

Jennifer Lopez – A.K.A (Deluxe Version)
"Let It Be Me"

Tamar Braxton
"Let Me Know" ft. Future (Single)

Nikki Yanofsky - Little Secret
"Little Secret"
"Necessary Evil"

2015

Fifth Harmony – Reflection
"Body Rock"
"I'm In Love With A Monster"

Ciara – Jackie
"Jackie (B.M.F.)"
"Stuck on You"
"I Bet"
"I Got You"
"One Woman Army (Intro)"
"I Bet (Remix)" (featuring Joe Jonas)

JoJo – III.
 "Say Love"

Various Artists – Hotel Transylvania 2
 Fifth Harmony – "I'm in Love with a Monster"

Tamar Braxton – Calling All Lovers
 "Let Me Know" (featuring Future)

Nathan Sykes – "Unfinished Business"
 "Money"
 "Famous"
 "Over and Over Again"
 "Burn Me Down"

2016

Nathan Sykes - Unfinished Business
"Money" 
"Twist" 
"Famous" 
"Over and Over Again" 
"Burn Me Down"

Seyi Shay - Seyi or Shay
"Right Now"

Mali Music - "Digital" (Single)

Major - I Am MAJOR. (EP)
"Why I Love You" 
"Hit the Road" ft. Mali Music 
"My Future" 
"All Day Tho" (Interlude) 
"My Oh My" 
"Serendipity" ft. Jade Novah 
"Way of the World" 
"Keep On" ft. Kevin McCall 
"CHANGERIGHTNOW" ft. Amber Riley 
"Why I Love You (Dance Remix)"

Jakubi - 61 Berkley (EP)
"Pillow"

Angel - HER (EP)
"Fvck With You" ft. Rich Homie Quan

Pia Mia - "We Should Be Together" (Single)

2017

Keyshia Cole – 11:11 Reset
"You" ft. Remy Ma and French Montana

La'Porsha Renae – Already All Ready
"What Is Love" 
"Good Woman" 
"Hideout" 
"When In Rome" 
"Breathe" 
"No Problem (Self Talk)" 
"Already All Ready" 
"Will You Fight" 
"Lock You Down" 
"Send Me Your Love"

Marsha Ambrosius - "Luh Ya" (Single)

MGK - Bloom
"Wake + Bake" 
"Can't Walk" 
"Rehab"

Jack and Jack - Gone (EP)
"Hurt People"

Mali Music - Transition of Mali
"Bow Out" 
"I Will"

Chip – League of My Own II
"About Time" ft. Kojo Funds 
"Hit Me Up" ft. Ella Mai 
"Settings"

Fifth Harmony – Fifth Harmony
"Sauced Up"

Moxie Raia - "Wheels"(Single)

Mic Lowry – Mood EP
Can't Lie" 
"Boomerang"

2018

OK Mayday – Conversations
"Good" 
"Cut Too Deep" 
"Something More"

SiR – November
"Dreaming of Me"

Angel – Woman
"Return of the Mackin"

Estelle – Lovers Rock
"Better"

The Bonfyre – Ready to Love (EP)
"Ready to Love" 
"Keep Me Waiting"

Lauren Sanderson – Don't Panic!
"The Only One" 
"In The Middle"

Major – Even More
"Honest" (Single) 
"Better With You In It" 
"Love Me Ole" ft. Kas 
"Love Crazy" ft. Andre Troutman
"Shine Bright" 
"New Day" 
"Even More" 
"Street Lights" 
"Why I Love You" ft. NSTASIA

June's Diary – All of Us
"Have You Ever"

Ella Mai – Ella Mai
"Cheapshot"

Empire Cast – Soundtrack (Season 5)
"We've Got Time" ft. Mario 
"Look At Us Now" ft. Jussie Smollett 
"Filling Spaces" 
"Make It Last"

Janet Jackson – "Made for Now" (featuring Daddy Yankee) (single)

2019

Kas – "This Side" (Single)

Kelly Rowland – "Crown" (Single)

ELHAE – Trouble in Paradise
"Moments" feat. Sevyn Streeter

Tigo B – "Too Dumb" (Single)

Rotimi – Walk With Me
"Love Riddim" 
"Decisions"

The Bonfyre – "U Say" ft. 6lack

Chef Sean – "No Name" ft. Siya (Single)

Kas – "Dizzy" (Single)

Kierra Sheard – “Don't Judge Me (Single)

Rick Ross – *Port of Miami 2
"Summer Reign" ft. Summer Walker

Robin Thicke – "When You Love Somebody" (Single)

Next Town Down – Juliet 
"Bussdown" ft. Rich the Kid

MAJOR. – "Even More" ft. Brandy (Single)

Tank – Elevation
"WWJD"

Rotimi – "Love Riddim" Remix ft. Akon (Single)

MAJOR. – "Love Me Ole (Latin Remix)" ft. Cierra Ramirez (Single)

Rotimi – "In My Bed" ft. Wale

2020

Ok Mayday – "Kind of Promising" (Single)

Rhyon Brown – "Leaves" (Single)

Chef Sean – "No Name" Remix ft. Jeremih (Single)

Empire Cast – Soundtrack (Season 6) – "Bossy" ft. Serayah & Ta'Rhonda Jones

Kierra Sheard – Kierra
"Don't Judge Me" ft. Missy Elliott 
"Human" 
"Grateful" 
"Beautiful" 
"Things You Do"

Rotimi – Unplugged Sessions EP
"Love Riddim" 
"In My Bed"

The Bonfyre – Love, Lust & Let Downs: Chapter One - EP
"U Say" ft. 6lack 
"U Remind Me" ft. Wale 
"Pay Them No Mind"

Rhyon Brown – "Weakend" ft. D Smoke (Single)

Macy Kate – Cry For Help
"Good Time"

Carmen Reece – Evoke
"Daydreaming"

Ok Mayday – "Blossoms" - (Single)

Kas – Long Story Short
"Right Back" ft. Kaye Fox
"This Side"
"Dizzy"
"Black"

MAJOR. – "Doves Cry" - (Single)

Queen Naija – "Misunderstood" 
"I'm Her"
"Beautiful"

2021

Inayah – "Fallin" - (Single)

Charm La'Donna– La'Donna
"See It"

Shelley FKA Dram–Shelley FKA DRAM
"All Pride Aside with Summer Walker" ft. Summer Walker

Bee-B – "Stretch" - (Single)

Inayah – "What Are We?" - (Single)

Godfather of Harlem – "Shit Don't Feel Right" ft. Buddy - (Single)

Crystal Nicole – "Miracle" - (Single)

Mechi Peiretti – "Superheroina" - (Single)

Inayah - Side A
"Peaches"

Bee-B – "Confidence" - (Single)

Rotimi - All Or Nothing 
"All Or Nothing" 
 "Weapon"

GoGo Morrow – "Love Me" Usher | Kendrick Lamar MASHUP

GoGo Morrow – "Still Mine" – Yung Bleu | Lil TJay | 6LACK | Brownstone MASHUP

GoGo Morrow – "Girls Love Drake" - Drake | Destiny’s Child | Aaliyah | Janet Jackson MASHUP

2022

Jen Ash – Sings Empire (Original Score) EP 

 "We Got Time"

 "Filling Spaces"

OK MAYDAY – JUST A PHANTOM EP 

 "Colorful"

 "Good"

 "Just a Phantom"

 "Stepping Down"

 "Blossoms"

 "Human (To Be Scared)"

Ella Mai – Heart On My Sleeve 

 "Leave You Alone"

GoGo Morrow – In The Way - (Single)

Quincy – Q Side B Side EP 

 "Face Off"

 "Biggest Investment"

GoGo Morrow – Ready EP 

 "Comfortable"

 "Nu Nu" ft. Teddy Riley

 "I.O.U"

 "Don't Stop"

 "In The Way"

 "Issues"

 "With You" ft. Symba

Production discographies
Hip hop discographies